Aluis Kuylaars (born 17 May 1971) is a South African former cricketer who played primarily as a right-arm pace bowler. She appeared in 23 One Day Internationals for South Africa between 1997 and 2000. She played domestic cricket for Western Province.

References

External links
 
 

1971 births
Living people
Cricketers from Cape Town
South African women cricketers
South Africa women One Day International cricketers
Western Province women cricketers
20th-century South African women
21st-century South African women